James Nicholas Geoffrey Bowden  (born 27 May 1960) is a British diplomat who was ambassador to Chile from 2018 to 2020.

Career
Bowden was educated at Eton, then served in the Royal Green Jackets 1980–86. He then joined the diplomatic service and served at Aden, Khartoum, Washington, Riyadh and at the Foreign and Commonwealth Office. He was deputy head of mission in Kabul in 2002, Kuwait 2003–04, Baghdad 2004–05, and Kuwait again 2005–06. He was ambassador to the Kingdom of Bahrain 2006–11 and to the Sultanate of Oman 2011–14. He was seconded as deputy private secretary to the Prince of Wales 2014–17. He took up his post as ambassador to the Republic of Chile in June 2018.

Honours
Bowden was appointed OBE in 2002 "in recognition of services in support of operations in Afghanistan", CMG in the 2012 New Year Honours, and MVO in the 2017 New Year Honours.

References

Bowden, James Nicholas Geoffrey , Who's Who 2018, 1 December 2017
Jamie Bowden CMG OBE MVO , gov.uk

1960 births
Living people
People educated at Eton College
Royal Green Jackets officers
Ambassadors of the United Kingdom to Bahrain
Ambassadors of the United Kingdom to Oman
Ambassadors of the United Kingdom to Chile